Cosetta Campana (born 12 June 1961) is a former Italian sprinter (400 m).

Biography
In the era of Erica Rossi (20 national championships), she was able to win the national championships three times. She has 43 caps in national team from 1983 to 1994.

Achievements

National titles
2 wins in 400 metres at the Italian Athletics Championships (1986, 1992)
1 win in 400 metres at the Italian Athletics Indoor Championships (1987)

See also
 Italy at the 1986 European Athletics Championships

References

External links
 

1961 births
Italian female sprinters
Living people
Athletes (track and field) at the 1984 Summer Olympics
Olympic athletes of Italy
World Athletics Championships athletes for Italy
Mediterranean Games gold medalists for Italy
Mediterranean Games silver medalists for Italy
Mediterranean Games bronze medalists for Italy
Athletes (track and field) at the 1983 Mediterranean Games
Athletes (track and field) at the 1987 Mediterranean Games
Athletes (track and field) at the 1991 Mediterranean Games
Mediterranean Games medalists in athletics
Olympic female sprinters